Ecliptica is the first full-length album by the power metal band Sonata Arctica. It was released in 1999 through Spinefarm Records in Europe and through Century Media in the United States. It is the band's only album featuring bassist Janne Kivilahti. In 2016, vocalist, keyboardist and songwriter Tony Kakko described the album as "like the extension of our demo, we didn't know what we were doing so that reflects on the album and makes kind of cute if you will."

In 2017, Loudwire ranked it as the 16th best power metal album of all time.

Songs and themes 

Regarding the track "Blank File", which covers the topic of privacy on the Internet, vocalist Tony Kakko once stated:

The theme would be again mentioned in the band's next album, Silence, on the track "Weballergy".

In the song "Letter to Dana", the title character, Dana O'Hara, is named after The X-Files's Dana Scully.

15th anniversary re-recording 
In 2014 Sonata Arctica announced through their Facebook page that they had re-recorded the entire album for its 15th anniversary. The new edition is titled Ecliptica - Revisited; 15th Anniversary Edition and was released on 24 October 2014, with the same track-listing as the original regular edition release plus one unreleased bonus track.

Commenting on the album, keyboardist Henrik Klingenberg (who was not a member of the band at the time Ecliptica was released) said:

The re-recording's first single was "Kingdom for a Heart", released digitally on 12 September 2014. According to Klingenberg, the song was chosen in order to "represent the overall sound of the album".

On an interview held after the album release, Klingenberg said the only significant changes applied to the album were the lower keys and the rearranged solos, and that the band resisted the "temptation" to give the songs a "complete overhaul". He also said most of the album was recorded in the band members' own home studios, during breaks from their Pariah's Child World Tour. He also commented:

Track listing

Personnel
Tony Kakko – vocals, keyboards
Jani Liimatainen – guitars
Janne Kivilahti – bass
Tommy Portimo – drums
Raisa Aine – flute on "Letter to Dana"

Technical staff 
 Ahti Kortelainen - production at Tico Tico Studios
 Mikko Karmila - mixing at Finnvox Studios
 Mika Jussila - mastering at Finnvox Studios

15th anniversary edition line-up 
Tony Kakko – vocals, keyboards
Elias Viljanen – guitars
Pasi Kauppinen – bass
Henrik Klingenberg - keyboards
Tommy Portimo – drums

Charts

Certifications

References

External links
 Album info on the official Sonata Arctica website
 Album lyrics on the official Sonata Arctica website

Sonata Arctica albums
1999 debut albums
Spinefarm Records albums
Nuclear Blast albums